The canton of Mitry-Mory is a French administrative division, located in the arrondissement of Meaux, in the Seine-et-Marne département (Île-de-France région).

Demographics

Composition 
At the French canton reorganisation which came into effect in March 2015, the canton was expanded from 13 to 19 communes:

Compans
Dammartin-en-Goële
Juilly
Longperrier
Marchémoret
Mauregard
Le Mesnil-Amelot
Mitry-Mory
Montgé-en-Goële
Moussy-le-Neuf
Moussy-le-Vieux
Nantouillet 
Othis
Rouvres
Saint-Mard
Saint-Pathus
Thieux
Villeneuve-sous-Dammartin
Vinantes

See also
Cantons of the Seine-et-Marne department
Communes of the Seine-et-Marne department

References

Mitry Mory